Springerichthys kulbickii, known commonly as the Kulbicki's triplefin, is a species of triplefin blenny in the genus Springerichthys. It was described by Ronald Fricke and John E. Randall in 1994, honouring the fish ecologist reef-fish ecologist Michel L. Kulbicki of L'Office de la Recherche Scientifique et Technique d’Outre-Mer in Nouméa, who collected type in New Caledonia, in its specific name.

References

Kulbicki's triplefin
Fish described in 1994